Europa of Macedon was the daughter of Philip II by his last wife, Cleopatra Eurydice. She is widely believed to have been murdered along with her mother, by Olympias, Philip's fourth wife and the mother of Alexander the Great.

See also
Caranus (son of Philip II)

References

Ancient Macedonian women
Murdered royalty of Macedonia (ancient kingdom)
4th-century BC Greek women